William Howe Guion I (1817–1884) headed the Williams and Guion Black Star Line.

Biography
He was the son of John Guion and Maria Howe of Westchester County, New York.

William had a younger brother Stephen Barker Guion which was one of the "Williams & Guion Black Star Line"  founders.

William was married and had a son, whose name was also William Howe Guion II or William Howe Guion the Second (cerca 1830–1886).

Stephen Barker Guion passed through the Atlantic Ocean to Liverpool in 1852 where he was acted as an agent of the "Williams & Guion Black Star Line". John Stanton Williams was another partner of the "Williams & Guion Black Star Line" in New York City.

The elder brother William Howe Guion joined the office in New York City in 1853.

In January 1884, William Howe Guion left the "Williams & Guion Black Star Line" and his nephew William Howe Guion, Jr., 36  years old, became a partner and the company received name "Guion & Co.".

See also

References

Further reading
Washington Post; November 14, 1889; How Mr. Guion met the ex-President on a Notable Occasion. Mr. William H. Guion; of New York, the head of the Guion Steamship Company, is at the Arlington. He is now in the seventies, but vigorous and bright. He was one of the escort which brought the remains of General Grant from Mount McGregor to New York.

1817 births
1890 deaths
19th-century American businesspeople